Cogaula is a townland in the civil parish of Islandeady, County Mayo, Ireland.

References

townlands of County Mayo